Barbara Shollar was an American education consultant, editor, and activist. For some time, she also taught writing at the Queens College, CUNY.  With Marian Arkin, she had edited several books on tutoring, and also the Longman Anthology of World literature by women (1989).  For her PhD, she worked on the immigrant woman's autobiographical tradition. 

On December 24, 2004, she was shot dead by her longtime lesbian partner Helen Chumbley in the backyard of their home in Yonkers.

References

2004 deaths
American murder victims
American LGBT rights activists
Year of birth missing
People murdered in New York (state)
Deaths by firearm in New York (state) 
Queens College, City University of New York faculty